Gamle Oslo Fotballklubb is a Norwegian association football club from Oslo.

The club was founded by Adam Larsen Kwarasey, David Driscoll, Kelepha Sarr and Andreas Holzweiler in 2017. The club started its league existence by taking over the licence of Hammersborg FK, which went defunct. Kwarasey became manager and Holzweiler shirt sponsors. However, the club was denied its desired name, FC Oslo, because it was deemed to pretentious.

The men's football team instantly won promotion from the 2018 6. divisjon and the 2019 5. divisjon, reaching the 2021 4. divisjon. The team then reached the first round of the 2022 Norwegian Football Cup. The climb was aided by signing several former professional players, many with ties to Vålerenga, including Muhamed Keita.

References

Football clubs in Norway
Sport in Oslo
2017 establishments in Norway
Association football clubs established in 2017